Eugene Edzards Covert (February 6, 1926 – January 15, 2015) was an aeronautics specialist born in Rapid City, South Dakota credited with the world's first practical wind tunnel magnetic suspension system, and was a member of the Rogers Commission. In the 1970s he was the chief scientist of the US Air Force and technical director of the European Office of Aerospace Research and Development.

In 2005 it was announced that he would receive the Daniel Guggenheim Medal for aviation.

Covert graduated from the University of Minnesota in 1946 and received a Masters in Aeronautical Engineering in 1948. In 1958, he received a doctorate from the Massachusetts Institute of Technology.  Covert received a number of awards and citations, including the Exceptional Civilian Service Award from the United States Air Force (1973, 1976), the University Educator of the Year, Engineering Science Division, American Society of Aerospace Education, National Aeronautic Association (1980), the NASA Public Service Award (1981), the MIT Graduate Student Council Outstanding Teacher Aware (1985), the American Institute of Aeronautics and Astronautics Ground Testing Aware (1990), the Advisory Group for Aerospace Research and Development von Karman Medal (1990), and the American Institute of Aeronautics and Astronautics W. F. Durand Lectureship (1992).  He also received an Outstanding Achievement Award from the University of Minnesota in 2007.

References

External links

2015 deaths
University of Minnesota College of Science and Engineering alumni
Massachusetts Institute of Technology alumni
People from Rapid City, South Dakota
Chief Scientists of the United States Air Force
1926 births
Members of the United States National Academy of Engineering
American scientists